Green Linnet, green linnet, or Green Linnets may refer to:
 Green Linnet Records, American independent record label that specialized in Celtic music
 green linnet (Chloris chloris), another name for the European greenfinch
 Green Linnets, 39th (Dorsetshire) Regiment of Foot nickname
 Green Linnets (Ireland), Irish regiment in the American War of Independence